Francis Beaumont (15841616) was an English dramatist.

Francis Beaumont may also refer to:

Francis Beaumont (MP) (died 1598), English MP for Aldeburgh
Francis William Beaumont (19031941), British film producer
Francis Beaumont, a character of White Squall (film), 1996
 Frank Beaumont, a character's son from the film

See also
Beaumont (disambiguation)